A Dādābāḍī is a type of shrine, usually located near a Jain temple, and dedicated to one of the four Dādā Gurus revered by the Kharatara Gaccha sect of the Svetambara Jains. The most notable shrines are in Ajmer, Malpura and Mehrauli. The four Dādā Gurus are Jinadatta Sūri (1075-1154 CE), Jinachandra Sūri Maṇidhārī (1140-1166 CE), Jinakuśala Sūri (1280-1332 CE) and Jinachandra Sūri II (1541-1613 CE).

Descriptions and lore

Ajmer
Ajmer is the "samadhi sthal" (memorial resting place) of the first Dādā Guru, Jinadatta Sūri. Two idols are inside: one of Parshva, the 23rd Tirthankara, which is made of seven metals and includes footprints believed to be his; and one of Vimalnath, the 13th Tirthankara. The shrine has a "teerth kshetra" (pilgrimage center) that was established in the 12th century.

Malpura
The dādābadī at Malpura is the one that receives the most visitors. It is dedicated to the Dādā Guru Jinakushala Sūri, who attained Samadhi (the heavenly abode) in Deraur (now in Pakistan), prior to which he stayed at Malpura gathering followers. It is believed that he appeared to one of those followers after his death to give him his insight and wisdom, while standing on a stone that still bears his footprint.

Mehrauli
The dādābadī in Mehrauli, Delhi, is the place where the second Dādā Guru Manidhari Jinachandra Sūri ji was cremated. According to the legend, while on his deathbed, he told his followers that when he died the "Mani" (magic jewel) embedded in his forehead would fall out and should be placed in a bowl of milk. He also instructed them that his body should not be kept anywhere while preparing for the funeral. Everyone was so sad, however, that they forgot his instructions and set his body on the ground. When they tried to move it again, it wouldn't budge. Even elephants were used, but all attempts failed and the last rites had to be performed right there, at the spot where the shrine now stands.

See also
 List of Jain temples

References

Further reading
 Three Apabhraṁśa works of Jinadatta Sūri, with commentaries. Edited with introductory notes and appendices by Lalchandra Bhagawandas Gandhi. Baroda, Oriental Institute (1967)

External links
 Jainteerth.com: A guide to Jain teerths in India. (English)

Jain temples in Rajasthan